David Pickett (May 26, 1874 – April 22, 1950) was an American outfielder in Major League Baseball. He played for the Boston Beaneaters in 1898.

External links

1874 births
1950 deaths
Sportspeople from Brookline, Massachusetts
Major League Baseball outfielders
Boston Beaneaters players
Dayton Veterans players
Lowell Tigers players
Baseball players from Massachusetts
19th-century baseball players
Newport Colts players